Ghatsila Assembly constituency is an assembly constituency in the Indian state of Jharkhand. Before 2000, this constituency was in Bihar.

Overview
According to the Delimitation of Parliamentary and Assembly Constituencies Order, 2008 of the Election Commission of India, Ghatshila Assembly constituency covers Ghatsila police station and Musabnai police station (excluding Palasbani, Asta Koyali, Nunia, Kumarasol, Barakanjiya, Bomaro Bangoriya and Damudih gram panchayats).  It is a reserved constituency for Scheduled Tribes. Ghatshila (Vidhan Sabha constituency) is a part of Jamshedpur (Lok Sabha constituency).

Members of Assembly 

2019: Ramdas Soren, Jharkhand Mukti Morcha
2014: Laxman Tudu, Bharatiya Janata Party
2009: Ramdas Soren, Jharkhand Mukti Morcha
2005: Pradeep Kumar Balmuchu, Indian National Congress
2000:	Pradeep Kumar Balmuchu	INC	
1995:	Pradeep Kumar Balmuchu	INC	
1990:	Surya Singh Besra, IND	
1985:	Karan Chandra Mardi,	INC	
1980:	Tika Ram Majhi,	CPI	
1977:	Tika Ram Majhi,	CPI	
1972:	Tika Ram Majhi,	CPI

Election Results

2019

See also
Vidhan Sabha
List of states of India by type of legislature

References

Assembly constituencies of Jharkhand